James  Gbilee (born 2 May, 1983). is a Liberian football player. He last played for Kalighat Milan Sangha in the I-League 2nd Division in India.

Positions

He can also play as a midfielder or striker.

Honours
Shillong Lajong
I-League 2nd Division: 2011, third place 2009
Federation Cup: runner-up 2009–10
Meghalaya Invitation Cup: 2010, 2011

Notes

External links
James Gbilee at Soccerway

Liberian footballers
Liberian expatriate sportspeople in India
1987 births
Living people
Liberian expatriate footballers
Expatriate footballers in India
Shillong Lajong FC players
I-League players
Association football forwards